The John Jones House is a historic house at 1 Winthrop Street in Stoneham, Massachusetts.  Built in 1874, it is a well-preserved example of a house with classic, yet modest, Italianate features.  The two-story wood-frame structure is finished in clapboards, with a side-gable roof and twin interior chimneys.  It has a three bay front facade, with bay windows flanking a center entry that is sheltered by a porch connected to the bay roofs.  John Jones, the first owner, was a shoemaker.

The house was listed on the National Register of Historic Places in 1984.

See also
National Register of Historic Places listings in Stoneham, Massachusetts
National Register of Historic Places listings in Middlesex County, Massachusetts

References

Houses on the National Register of Historic Places in Stoneham, Massachusetts
Italianate architecture in Massachusetts
Houses completed in 1874
Houses in Stoneham, Massachusetts